Roar is an American anthology series from Liz Flahive and Carly Mensch, the creators of GLOW. Based on the 2018 short story collection of the same name by Cecelia Ahern, the 8-episode series premiered on Apple TV+ on April 15, 2022.

Premise 
Each story in the collection is about women's experiences and how women navigate through others' perceptions of them as well as their own. Highlighting what it means to be a woman, these stories are considered "darkly comic feminist fables."

Production

Development 
Roar was announced in August 2018, with the news that GLOW creators Liz Flahive and Carly Mensch were showrunning the TV series being developed based on Cecelia Ahern's short story collection Roar, published in the UK in November 2018 and in the US in April 2019. The project would be produced by Nicole Kidman and Per Saari's Blossom Films, Bruna Papandrea's Made Up Stories, and Theresa Park. Additionally, Ahern's Greenlight Go Productions and Endeavor Content were also attached to produce.

On March 2, 2021, it was announced that the show will air on Apple TV+ as eight 30-minute episodes each told from a female point of view, which mark Flahive’s and Mensch's first project under their new overall deal with the streamer.

Casting 
The casting of Nicole Kidman, Cynthia Erivo, Merritt Wever, and Alison Brie was announced on March 2, 2021. In August 2021, Betty Gilpin, Meera Syal, Fivel Stewart, and Kara Hayward joined the cast.

Filming 
Production for Roar began in Los Angeles, California on May 28, 2021, and concluded on August 1, 2021. So Yong Kim, Rashida Jones, Quyen Tran and Anya Adams directed episodes of the series.

Episodes

Release 
All 8 episodes of Roar were released on April 15, 2022.

Reception
The review aggregator website Rotten Tomatoes reported a 71% approval rating with an average rating of 6.3/10, based on 31 critic reviews. The website's critics consensus reads, "The feminist themes of Roar don't carry smoothly across some installments, but the sheer amount of talent on hand comes through loud and clear." Metacritic, which uses a weighted average, assigned a score of 57 out of 100 based on 12 critics, indicating "mixed or average reviews".

Controversy
In May 2022, the British TV show Gogglebox featured a scene from the fifth episode "The Woman Who Was Fed By a Duck" wherein the duck performs a sex act on the woman. The broadcast of this scene resulted in over 200 complaints to the broadcasting regulator, Ofcom.

References

External links
 

Apple TV+ original programming
2020s American anthology television series
2022 American television series debuts
English-language television shows
Television series by Made Up Stories
Television series based on short fiction